KDP may refer to:
 Communist Party of Germany (Kommunistische Partei Deutschlands)
Kurdistan Democratic Party of Iraqi Kurdistan
Kurdish Democratic Party of Iran of Iranian Kurdistan
Korea Democratic Party
Khmer Democratic Party
Kappa Delta Pi
Monopotassium phosphate, a soluble salt used in a variety of food and non-linear optical processes.
Kindle Direct Publishing, Amazon.com's e-book publishing unit
Keurig Dr Pepper, American conglomerate that merged in 2018

See also
Constitutional Democratic Party (Konstitutsionno-demokraticheskaya partiya), a 1905–1917 Russian political party

it:PSK